Big Wave may refer to:

 Big Wave (Misato Watanabe album), 1993
 Big Wave (Tatsuro Yamashita album), 1984
 "Big Wave", a song by Pearl Jam from Pearl Jam, 2006
 The Big Wave, a 1948 novel by Pearl S. Buck

See also
 Big Wave Bay (disambiguation)